Mayang Reservoir (Mayangdong-chosuji) is a  artificial lake, or reservoir, lying in the mountains of North Hamgyong Province of North Korea at an altitude of  above sea level.  It is one of North Korea's designated Natural Monuments and has been identified by BirdLife International as an Important Bird Area (IBA) because it supports a population of endangered scaly-sided mergansers.

References

Important Bird Areas of North Korea
Natural monuments of North Korea
Reservoirs in North Korea
North Hamgyong